Anna Maria van Geene (27 February 1928 – 14 October 1992) was a Dutch gymnast. She competed in the women's artistic team all-around event at the 1948 Summer Olympics.

References

External links
 

1928 births
1992 deaths
Dutch female artistic gymnasts
Olympic gymnasts of the Netherlands
Gymnasts at the 1948 Summer Olympics
Gymnasts from Amsterdam